Zoltán Ágh (born 28 August 1991) is a Slovak football defender  of Hungarian ethnicity who currently plays for Soproni VSE.

References

External links
FK DAC 1904 Dunajská Streda profile

1991 births
Living people
Slovak footballers
Association football defenders
FC DAC 1904 Dunajská Streda players
ŠK Senec players
FC ŠTK 1914 Šamorín players
Slovak Super Liga players
Hungarians in Slovakia
2. Liga (Slovakia) players
Soproni VSE players